Three Lakes may refer to:

Places 

 Rural Municipality of Three Lakes No. 400, Saskatchewan, Canada

 Three Lakes, Florida, United States
 Three Lakes, Wisconsin, a town in the United States
 Three Lakes (community), Wisconsin, an unincorporated community in the United States
 Three Lakes, Washington, United States

Lakes
Three Lakes, a complex of three small lakes in Redwood County, Minnesota, US

Other
 Three Lakes, Utah, near Kanab, Utah. US,  Primary home of the Kanab Ambersnail, a critically endangered species.